Zdeněk Hák (born 13 December 1958) is a Czech former biathlete. He competed at the 1980 Winter Olympics and the 1984 Winter Olympics.

References

External links
 

1958 births
Living people
Czech male biathletes
Olympic biathletes of Czechoslovakia
Biathletes at the 1980 Winter Olympics
Biathletes at the 1984 Winter Olympics
People from Jilemnice
Sportspeople from the Liberec Region